Tenagino Probus was a Roman soldier and procuratorial official whose career reached its peak at the end of the sixth decade of the third century AD (c. 255–260). A poverty of primary sources means that nothing is known for certain of his origins or early career. However, in later years he served successively as Praeses  (governor) of the province of Numidia (i.e. ) and of Egypt, (i.e. Praefectus ). These were both very senior procuratorial offices, the latter in particular traditionally considered one of the pinnacles of an equestrian career. In these roles he exercised military skills in addition to administrative ones; as  he led military operations outside his province. He died resisting the invasion of Egypt by the forces of Zenobia of Palmyra in the troubled  between Emperors Claudius II and Aurelian.

Despite the limited availability of information about Probus, the fact that he was: (i) entrusted with the government of two of the Empire's most economically and strategically significant provinces; and (ii) given important military command outside his province (at least during his time as ) indicates that he had the reputation of a highly competent Imperial functionary. His known appointments suggest that both Emperor Gallienus and Gallienus's  successor, Claudius II, held him in high regard. Probus was likely among the relatively small group of professional soldiers who benefited from the opening up of provincial governorships and senior military commands, which were previously reserved for senators.

Primary sources

Literary 

Probus is referred to by the Historia Augusta (SHA) in the  under the name Probatus. In the garbled account in the  recounting the campaigns of Marcus Aurelius Probus in North Africa and Egypt, the future emperor is credited with actions that other, more reliable, sources indicate should be attributed to Tenagino Probus. The SHA mentions him only as a military commander, making no reference to his procuratorial status in Numidia or Egypt.

The text makes no reference to his earlier appointment in Numidia. George Syncellus and Zonaras largely reiterate Zosimus, with some confusion of the material.

Epigraphic 

A number of epigraphic inscriptions attest to the existence of Tenagino Probus and some details of his career.
In Latin, from Lambaesis,  (now Lambèse, Tunisia). Dated to 267-8 AD in the principate of Gallienus. Probus is not mentioned by name, but the context suggests that the inscription relates to his term of office, an interpretation authoritative commentators generally accept.
In Latin, from  Thamugadi, Numidia (now Timgad, Algeria). It likely dates from soon after Claudius' accession to the purple in mid-268 AD, but before his election as consul for 269 AD at end-268.
In Latin, from Thuburbo Maius, Numidia, (now Henchir-Kasbat, Tunisia). The  referred to is probably . The date is 269 AD, under Claudius.
The inscription is usually assigned to late 269/early 270 AD.

Origins and early career

Origins 

No literary or epigraphic evidence exists to shed light on Probus' origins.

Onomastic analysis of his  (i.e. his family name) suggests that Tenagino was quite rare. Only two occurrences of the name are recorded, both in northeast Italy: Tenigenonia Claudia; and Q. Tenagino Maximus. These inscriptions might indicate that Probus originated in this region, but are not conclusive. However, Probus'  does indicate that his family's citizen-status pre-dated the Constitutio Antoniniana of 212 AD. This may mean that the family were people of substance.

Early career 

No available information speaks to Probus' early career. Some evidence indicates long-term military service, but it is unknown whether he was already of equestrian status when he enlisted in the army.

Until at least 260 AD, and possibly even later, Numidia had been a pro-praetorial province, i.e. it had been governed on behalf of the Emperor by a senatorial Legatus Augusti (an official who had previously held office in Rome or elsewhere as a praetor). (The title  did not always indicate that a governor was of equestrian rank, but in the case of Numidia he was, as were all known subsequent governors of that province.) As noted, it is now generally assumed that Probus was the official referred to in that inscription, even though his name has disappeared from the text. Indeed, he may have been Numidia's first equestrian governor. Therefore, it is highly likely that Probus was an early beneficiary of Gallienus's policy of giving equestrians military commands (over legions) and administrative posts (as governors of pro-praetorial provinces) that, prior to Gallienus' sole reign (260-268 AD), had been reserved almost exclusively for men of senatorial status.

Procuratorial career



The function 

 Numidia was one of the main sources of grain and olive oil, essential staples of the Roman diet, making the area a key resource underpinning the emperor's ability to control Rome and supply the armies stationed in Europe.
This legion was ostensibly meant to defend the north African provinces from the nomad populations on its southern boundaries, but for the most part this task was, arguably, not suited to a unit whose chief strength was its heavy infantry. The legion was an instrument at both too powerful and too blunt for that job.<ref>Shaw(1995:IX, passim).</ref> Instead, the strategic vision of the Imperial government seems to indicate that the chief role of the governor of Numidia as head of his legion was to uphold the Empire's authority, both in Numidia and in the entirety of the resource-rich African region, particularly the neighbouring province of Africa Proconsularis. During the reign of Gallienus and his successors,  rivalled Egypt itself as a granary of Rome. In this sense, the Emperor regarded the governor of Numidia as his "man-on-the spot" in Africa, and the legion commanded by the governor as the ultimate sanction of the Emperor's ability to exploit the region's strategic and economic benefits for the Empire's own purposes.
 After the loss of the western provinces to the "Gallic Emperor" Postumus and the de facto secession of the eastern provinces under Odenathus of Palmyra, the Numidian garrison constituted the only substantial reserve of military manpower available to Gallienus in Europe as he faced the Scythian inroads of 267–8.

For these reasons, Probus' appointment as  demonstrates that he had established a reputation for competence and earned Gallienus' trust.

 Probus in office 

No reliable information exists about Probus' period of office in Numidia.

However, the balance of academic opinion is that this story the sort of invention in which the SHA seems to delight and should, therefore, be rejected. The same passage in the  goes on to assert that "Probus" slew a "certain Aradio" – no further explanation – in single combat before honouring him with a magnificent tomb. This too is generally rejected, although some authorities are prepared to concede that it may be authentic.

  

 Strategic significance of Egypt 

Ever since Augustus' conquest of Egypt in the first century BC, the emperors of Rome had regarded their absolute control of this territory and its grain harvests as a sine qua non for the maintenance of their authority. Loss of control of Egypt would almost immediately undermine the Imperial government's ability to maintain control of the Roman people. When Claudius II appointed Probus to this office, he demonstrated that he (Claudius) had the utmost confidence in Probus, even though Probus had been a protégé of Claudius' predecessor Gallienus.

 Probus' term as  

Claudius II further demonstrated his confidence in Probus shortly after Probus assumed the prefecture of Egypt, when Claudius commissioned him to intervene militarily in the neighbouring senatorial province of Creta et Cyrenaica, which had suffered an incursion by the Marmaritae. Traditionally, Emperors hesitated to allow governors to undertake military action beyond the boundaries of their own province. However, as demonstrated in Numidia, forces stationed in Imperial provinces could be deployed in neighbouring  (lit. The epigraph refers to the Marmaritae's "audacity"  and suggests that Probus dealt with the incursion with effective dispatch – although, as was always the case, the victory was officially attributed to the reigning Emperor (i.e. Claudius). 'City of Claudius') in the Emperor's honour, although it is unclear whether this was intended to celebrate the defeat of the Marmaritae.

Only Zosimus records this action. However, recent archaeological discoveries in the Turkish province of Antalya suggest that, even as Claudius was concluding his war against the Scythian migrants in the Balkans, he had dispatched an expeditionary force under Lucius Aurelius Marcianus to repel attacks by Gothic pirates along the southern coasts of Asia Minor. It is thought that this force cooperated with Probus' naval force. Zosimus reports that the pirates were driven away "without achieving much" – an outcome that he attributes entirely to the efforts of Probus, but which was more likely the result of a combined operation.

 Final campaign and death 

Zosimus contains the fullest account of Probus' final campaign and death.

While Probus was away fighting the pirates at sea, Zenobia began a drive to extend her authority over Asia, Arabia and Egypt. One Timagenes, otherwise unknown, led a strong pro-Palmyrene faction in the population (and possibly in the Imperial garrison) in encouraging the targeting of Egypt in particular. In support of Timagenes, Zenobia's general Septiminus Zabdas invaded the province at the head of an army of 70,000 men and, together with his local allies, defeated the Egyptian loyalists who had mustered an army of 50,000. Zabdas then returned to Syria, leaving behind a garrison of 5,000, presumably in Alexandria.

When this news reached Probus, he returned to Egypt with the force he had led against the pirates and, with the support of those sympathetic to the Imperialist cause in Egypt, drove out Zabdas' garrison. Zabdas returned, but he was again defeated by Probus, the pro-Imperial Egyptian forces and "soldiers from Africa" – no further explanation. Probus then seems to have followed Timagenes upriver to the fortress of Babylon (located at the head of the Nile delta, now a suburb of modern Cairo), thus cutting off the enemy's escape route to Syria. However, using his knowledge of the surrounding country, Timagenes seized the summit of a nearby mountain with 2,000 men and,  launching a surprise attack on Probus' army, defeated it utterly. Probus was captured and, in the Roman heroic tradition, chose to kill himself rather than bear the ignominy of defeat.

The  broadly repeats this account, but describes Timagenes as a Palmyrene general rather than an anti-Roman Egyptian.

Papyrological and numismatic evidence suggests that Zabdas began his assault on Egypt in the autumn of 270 AD and by the end of the year had brought it firmly under the control of his queen Zenobia.

 Notes 

 Citations 

 Works cited 

 Abbreviations of works of reference SHA - The Augustan History: Life of the Deified Claudius Vita Divi Claudii (SHA VC) ); Life of Probus Vita Probi (SHA VP) );AE - L'Année Épigraphique; R. Cagnat et al (eds.); Paris; 1889-;PIR(2) - Prosopographia imperii Romani; E.Groag et al (eds.); Berlin; 1933-;PLRE - The prosopography of the later Roman Empire''; Jones, A.H.M., Martindale, J.R. and Morris, J. (eds.);Cambridge University Press; 1971–1992.

Primary sources 

Syncellus -  (Syncelllus);
Zonaras -  (Zonaras);
Zosumus -  (Zosimus)

Secondary sources 

 (Barnes 1972); 
(Saunders(1992));
;

Ancient Roman generals
Equestrian commanders of vexillationes
3rd-century Romans
3rd-century Roman governors of Egypt
Year of birth unknown
270 deaths
Roman governors of Egypt